Yock is a surname. Notable people with the surname include:

Ben Yock (born 1975), New Zealand cricketer
Daniel Alfred Yock (1975–1993), Australian aboriginal youth
Robert J. Yock (born 1938), American judge

Americanized surnames
Surnames of German origin